Crum Lynne is an unincorporated community in Ridley Township, Delaware County, Pennsylvania, United States.

Geography 
Crum Lynne is located at  (39.872335, -75.327966). Its elevation is 62 feet (19 m) and its hardiness zones  are 7a and 7b. It has a humid subtropical climate (Cfa) and average monthly temperatures range from 33.4° F in January to 78.2° F in July.

Transportation 
A station on the former Pennsylvania Railroad Philadelphia - Baltimore line, now the Crum Lynne SEPTA regional rail station, was named by a Pennsylvania Railroad vice president after Crumlin, Wales, where his mother was born.

The town also houses the headquarters of the Federal Railroad Administration's Office of Safety for Region 2, which governs Delaware, Maryland, New Jersey (from Camden south), Pennsylvania, Ohio, Virginia, West Virginia, and the District of Columbia.

Interstates 95 and 476 have an interchange in Crum Lynne. They form the southern and western boundaries, respectively. MacDade Boulevard is Crum Lynne's main east-to-west thoroughfare and parallels 95.

Notable people
 Bert Cooper, Professional Boxer
 Sylvia Seegrist, mass murderer
 Damiere Shaw, NCAA Coach
 Dino Vasso, NFL Coach
 Kurupt, Rapper

References

External links 
Crumlynne at Ridley Township History

Unincorporated communities in Delaware County, Pennsylvania
Unincorporated communities in Pennsylvania